Jeff or Jeffrey Long may refer to:

Jeff Long (athletic director) (born 1959), American athletics director
Jeff Long (writer) (born 1951), American writer
Jeffrey Long, American author and researcher on near-death experiences
Jeffrey C. Long, American genetic anthropologist
Jeffery D. Long, (born 1969), American scholar of religious studies
Jeffrey R. Long (born 1969), American inorganic and materials chemist

See also
Jeoff Long (born 1941), American former professional baseball player
Geoff Long (born c. 1930), Australian rules footballer